Litter is trash in small portions thrown inappropriately in a public place.

Litter may refer to:

Places
 Litter, Pulwama, a tehsil in Jammu and Kashmir, India
 Litter, a civil parish in the barony of Fermoy, County Cork, Ireland

Animals
 Litter (zoology), a group of mammals born of the same pregnancy
 Bedding (animals), or litter, material strewn in an animal's enclosure for it to sleep on and to absorb feces and urine
 Cat litter, or "kitty litter", loose, absorbent material as part of the indoor feces and urine disposal system for pets

Other uses
 Litter (rescue basket), a basket-like stretcher device used to ferry injured people
 Litter (vehicle), a piece of furniture mounted on a platform and carried by (usually human) muscle power
 Plant litter, dead plant material that has fallen to the ground
 The Litter, a 1960s psychedelic rock band

See also
 
 
 Letter (disambiguation)
 Liter
 Lotter
 Lutter (disambiguation)